John Walton (23 July 1784, Knaresborough, Yorkshire- 3 January 1862, Knaresborough) was an English entomologist who specialised in Coleoptera especially Curculionidae.
His collection is held by the Natural History Museum, London
John Walton was educated in first in Knaresborough then in London where he  studied Chemistry at the Mathematical Society of Spitalfields , then applying his science to sugar refining in his uncles refinery based in Whitechapel whom he succeeded in that lucrative business. By then wealthy he retired in 1832 to devote himself to entomology. He corresponded with Carl Johan Schönherr, Ernst Friedrich Germar and Louis Alexandre Auguste Chevrolat exchanging specimens with all three.

He was a fellow of the Entomological Society and the Linnaean Society.

Works
partial list
Walton J., 1838. Notes upon the genera Sitona, Polydrosus, Phyllobius, and Apion Entomological Magazine, 5: 1–21, 254–257
Walton, J. 1844 Notes on the Synonymy of the Genus Apion, with Descriptions of Five new Species Annals and Magazine of Natural History Series 1 Volume 13, 1844 - Issue 8
Walton J., 1856: List of British Curculionidae, with synonyma. Catalogue of British Rhynchophora. 46 pp

References
Anonym 1863: [Walton, J.] Proceedings of the Linnean Society of London, London, pp. XLIV-XLVI
Smith, F. 1862: [Walton, J.] (The) Transactions of the Entomological Society of London, Third Series, Journal of Proceedings, London 1 pp. 125–127
Walther Horn & Sigmund Schenkling: Index Litteraturae Entomologicae. Serie I: Die Welt-Literatur über die gesamte Entomologie bis inklusive 1863. Berlin 1928.

English entomologists
1862 deaths
1784 births
Coleopterists